The Meeting House is an Anabaptist church located in the Greater Toronto Area suburb of Oakville, Ontario. It consists of nineteen regional sites meeting mostly in cinemas, each of which has a lead pastor with a team of elders and part-time staff, with and interim senior pastor, Karmyn Bokma, and a board of overseers. With a consistent average weekly attendance of around 5,000, it is ranked by the Hartford Institute of Religion as the third largest church in Canada. The Meeting House is part of a denomination called Be in Christ.

History 
In 1985, Craig and Laura Sider moved to the Greater Toronto Area suburb of Oakville, Ontario, to start Upper Oaks Community Church. They were supported by the Brethren in Christ Canada.

In 1996, Craig and Laura accepted a leadership position with the Brethren in Christ in Pennsylvania. Bruxy Cavey became the teaching pastor, and the church met at Iroquois Ridge High School. Shortly afterward, the church changed its name to "The Meeting House".

In 2018, the attendance was about 5,000 people each Sunday morning. As of 2020, the church reported an average of 9,800 weekly livestream views.

As well as the main location and headquarters in Oakville, Ontario, The Meeting House has about 20 remote locations in Ontario, most around the Greater Toronto Area. Remote locations are referred to as "parishes" and meet usually in rented premises, mostly movie theatres. The locations have their own staff including pastors and worship groups. While much of the service at each remote location is specific to that location, the teaching is generally relayed from the Oakville location, either by live link or delayed a week. Regular attendees are encouraged to also join a Home Church. Home churches meet in homes every week or every two weeks on weekdays. Each Home Church is attached to a parish.

As well as the official parishes, there is a global community of churches that meet and make use of the livestreamed teaching of The Meeting House.

Leadership 

The Church is led by a board of overseers, and until 2022, senior pastor Darrell Winger, at which time Karmyn Bokma assumed the role of interim senior pastor.

Bruxy Cavey was the primary teaching pastor from 1996 to 2021, but resigned in March 2022 after an independent investigation determined that he had committed sexual misconduct. 

Danielle Strickland was hired in 2019 as an additional teaching pastor. She is the author of eight books including Better Together, The Ultimate Exodus and The Liberating Truth. In March 2022, she announced her resignation "in solidarity with the victim of abuse" by Cavey.

On March 25, 2022, the church announced that Winger would be stepping down. Winger stated that he believes the church needs "new leaders" as it moves into a "season of lament and refinement". On April 14, 2022, the church announced that interim senior leaders would be Karmyn Bokma and Matt Miles, as Senior Pastor and Senior Director respectively.

Teachings 

The Meeting House teaching aligns with Anabaptist teachings. They emphasize a lifestyle of compassion, peace, simplicity, and the priority of community. The Meeting House has a particular emphasis on the irreligious nature of the teachings of Jesus. Their core beliefs are outlined in the articles of faith and doctrine of their denomination.

Teaching (sermons) produced on the church's main Oakville campus is either simulcast or sent out on a one-week delay to its remote locations, most of which meet in cinemas. These sermons often take the form of series, which focus on specific books, people, or themes from the Bible.

The Meeting House also produces the "After Party" podcast. This is a live broadcast at 12:00pm EST each Sunday, and features a changing lineup of pastors, spiritual leaders and scholars who discuss the sermon from earlier in the day. This often involves content which was cut from the sermon, as well as congregation submitted questions.

Since March 2020 The Meeting House has been meeting entirely virtually, with both Home Church, and Sunday gatherings done using virtual tools.

Sexual assault charges and allegations 

In 2012, former youth pastor Kieran Naidoo was arrested and charged as part of a large scale child pornography investigation by the Ontario Provincial Police. He was charged with four counts of luring, four counts of sexual exploitation, invitation to sexual touching, and possession of child pornography. In January 2021, he was again arrested and charged with sexual exploitation regarding an incident that had occurred between 2002 and 2005. Toronto police stated that they believe there may be additional victims.

In 2014, youth pastor David Churchill was charged with sexual assault and sexual exploitation. The church later stated that Churchill was convicted.

In December 2021, Bruxy Cavey was accused of sexual misconduct and subsequently placed on leave of absence from his role as Teaching Pastor. Cavey subsequently resigned on March 3, 2022, after the conclusion of an independent external investigation into the allegations. The independent investigation into Cavey's conduct determined that he had engaged in a sexual relationship with a member of his congregation, which had begun as a "pastoral counselling relationship" and lasted for "a number of years".  The investigation concluded that this "amounted to sexual harassment", and that Cavey had "abused his power and authority". Cavey's pastoral credentials were also revoked by the Be In Christ Church of Canada. On March 8, teaching pastor Danielle Strickland announced her resignation, "in solidarity with the victim of abuse". In a statement, Maggie John, Chair of the Overseers Board, stated that Strickland did not agree with the language used in the report, and that both Strickland and the victim wanted the church "to use stronger language". As of March 2022, the church had removed all recordings of Cavey's teachings from its website as a result of his misconduct. 

On March 12, 2022, the Meeting House announced that it had engaged a victim advocate to receive concerns of sexual misconduct by a staff member of the church.

In a town hall on March 31, 2022, the church announced that it had received additional allegations against Cavey, and historical concerns related to Naidoo. These allegations have not yet been investigated. At the Town Hall, Overseer Carol Ann Stephen acknowledged "the harm and hurt that has happened" in the church and Ottawa Lead Pastor Eric Versluis spoke about the challenge of the church trying to discern who they are without Cavey.

On May 21, 2022, the church announced that it had received allegations against Tim Day, who had served as Senior Pastor of the church for 14 years. Day is accused of sexual misconduct and abuse.

On June 6, 2022, the Hamilton Police Service announced that they had arrested Cavey and charged him with sexual assault. In their announcement, the police stated that they "believe there may be more victims", encouraging them to come forward. Cavey was released with conditions pending a court appearance.

On June 7, 2022, at a Town Hall event, the church disclosed that they have received 38 reports about clergy sexual misconduct and abuse by former pastors Naidoo, Churchill, Cavey, and Day, along with other leaders and staff. At the event, Jennifer Hryniw, Co-Chair of the Overseers Board, acknowledged that there has been a pattern of "prioritizing the care and well-being of offenders over victims," describing multiple stories where victims "felt shamed and rejected by the church, while the offender was supported through so-called restoration."

References

External links 

 
 YouTube channel
 Kids and Youth Curriculum

Churches in Ontario
Anabaptism
Oakville, Ontario
Megachurches
Sexual abuse scandals in Protestantism